Christian Alexander Yount (born July 8, 1988) is an American football long snapper who is currently a free agent. He was signed by the Tampa Bay Buccaneers as an undrafted free agent in 2011 and has also played for the Cleveland Browns. Yount played college football for the University of California at Los Angeles (UCLA).

Professional career

Tampa Bay Buccaneers
After going unselected in the 2011 NFL Draft, Yount signed with the Tampa Bay Buccaneers. Originally, he made the roster out of training camp, but was released by the team on September 14, only to be re-signed on September 17. He was waived again on October 25.

Cleveland Browns
On November 29, 2011, Yount signed with the Cleveland Browns.

On August 6, 2013, Yount signed a five-year contract extension. On May 29, 2015, Yount was waived.

New England Patriots
On April 22, 2016, Yount signed with the New England Patriots. Yount was released on July 21, 2016.

References

External links
 Cleveland Browns bio
 UCLA Bruins football bio

1988 births
Living people
Players of American football from Los Angeles
American football long snappers
UCLA Bruins football players
Tampa Bay Buccaneers players
Cleveland Browns players
New England Patriots players
People from San Pedro, Los Angeles